Jim Lendall is an American politician, activist, and nurse. Lendall was the 2010 Green Party candidate for Arkansas governor.

Lendall, a former State Representative, from Little Rock was elected to four terms in the state legislature as both a Democrat and an independent. Lendall finished fourth in the 2006 governors race with 12,593 votes for 1.7% of the total vote.

Early life and education
James Lendall was born in Beverly, Massachusetts in 1947.
Lendall served in the United States Army from 1969 to 1971. He graduated from the University of Arkansas at Little Rock with a Bachelor of Arts in political science and history in 1974 and University of Arkansas for Medical Sciences with a Bachelor of Science in nursing in 1985.

He has worked at University of Arkansas for Medical Sciences and is currently a registered nurse at Arkansas Children's Hospital.

Lendall joined the Green Party of Arkansas in 2005 and is currently one of the party's two representatives on the Green National Committee.

References

Jim Lendall Official Website

1947 births
Living people
American nurses
Politicians from Little Rock, Arkansas
Arkansas Democrats
Arkansas Greens
University of Arkansas at Little Rock alumni
University of Arkansas for Medical Sciences alumni
Members of the Arkansas House of Representatives
People from Beverly, Massachusetts
United States Army soldiers
Male nurses
Arkansas Independents